Argentina at the 1936 Summer Olympics in Berlin, Germany was the nation's seventh appearance out of ten editions of the Summer Olympic Games. Argentina sent to the 1936 Summer Olympics its fourth national team, under the auspices of the Argentine Olympic Committee (Comité Olímpico Argentino) of 51 athletes (50 men and the first woman), who competed in 31 events in 8 sports. The flag bearer was Juan Carlos Zabala, the gold medalist in the immediately previous Summer Olympic Games marathon.

Medalists

Athletics

Men
Track & road events

Boxing

Fencing

Eleven fencers, all men, represented Argentina in 1936.

Men's foil
 Roberto Larraz
 Ángel Gorordo
 Rodolfo Valenzuela

Men's team foil
 Roberto Larraz
 Héctor Lucchetti
 Ángel Gorordo
 Luis Lucchetti
 Rodolfo Valenzuela
 Manuel Torrente

Men's épée
 Antonio Villamil
 Raúl Saucedo

Men's team épée
 Raúl Saucedo
 Luis Lucchetti
 Antonio Villamil
 Roberto Larraz
 Héctor Lucchetti

Men's sabre
 Vicente Krause
 José Manuel Brunet
 Carmelo Merlo

Polo

Men's tournament

Roster

Luis Duggan
Roberto Cavanagh
Andrés Gazzotti

Manuel Andrada
Enrique J. Alberdi
Diego Cavanagh

Juan Nelson
Juan Jose Reynal

First round

Gold medal match

Rowing

Men

Sailing

Open

Shooting

Five shooters represented Argentina in 1936.
Men

Swimming

Women

References

Nations at the 1936 Summer Olympics
1936
1936 in Argentine sport